Son of Mercy, is a 2020 Nigerian drama film directed by Amen Imasuen and produced by director himself with Mosco Imobhio. The film stars Alexx Ekubo and Linda Osifo in the lead roles whereas Nicholas Imasuen, Fidelis Castro, Edjodamen Ejehi and Cliff Igbinovia made supportive roles. It is the story of Efe, a young man growing up who stole his father’s pension money to travel abroad and was duped along the way, he must not return home except he makes it.

The film was shot in Edo, Nigeria. Initially planned to screen on 15 March 2020, the film made its premier later on 9 December 2020. Before that, it was previewed to public in Benin City, Edo state, in November, 2020. The film received mixed reviews from critics. It earned close to N8 Million during first 31 days.

Cast
 Alexx Ekubo as Efe
 Linda Osifo as Princess
 Nicholas Imasuen as Slim
 Fidelis Castro as Officer
 Edjodamen Ejehi as Mama
 Cliff Igbinovia as Papa
 Gregory Ojefua as Biggie
 Kelvin Ikeduba as Chairman
 Mosco Imobhio as Princess friend
 Victor Vita as Bullet

References

External links 
 

2020 films
English-language Nigerian films
2020 drama films
Nigerian drama films
2020s English-language films